The dialing code for Kosovo is +383. It was assigned by the ITU following an agreement between the authorities of Kosovo and Serbia in an EU-led dialog. Its dialing code was initially expected to become effective on January 1, 2015 but it was postponed to the finalization of the agreement in late August 2015. With the agreement of the Administration of the Republic of Serbia, the Director of TSB has assigned the international codes to Kosovo. Kosovo is represented in ITU as Kosovo* which the designation is without prejudice to positions on status, and is in line with UNSCR 1244 and the ICJ Opinion on the Kosovo declaration of independence. The EU has handed over  the temporary authorisation for mobile and the licence for fixed telephony services to be undertaken in Kosovo issued by the Kosovo Telecommunication Regulatory Authority to mts d.o.o.

History
Following the breakup of the SFR Yugoslavia in 1992, which had +38 as country code, Kosovo used the code +381, which was granted to FR Yugoslavia and later used by Serbia. The code was used for fixed line telephone services, whereas for mobile phone networks, it used either the Monaco code +377 or the Slovenian code +386. The new calling code +383 began its use in early 2017.

Current Number Range

Reactions to +383 code allocation 
The International Telecommunication Union "will not recognize Kosovo's independence", quote daily Koha Ditore, "as ITU will include the footnote on Kosovo" in the technical annexes. Kosovo's NISMA party leader Fatmir Limaj was quoted by KosovaPress agency to have said that with the agreement reached in Brussels, the Kosovo government "allowed the Serbian operator to work in Kosovo". Vice chairman of Kosovo's Vetëvendosje party, Shpend Ahmeti claimed that the agreement favored Serbia. "Telephone calls between cities in Serbia and cities in Kosovo will be treated as local calls. Serbia will preserve its assets in Kosovo and it will also have a license for Serb operators within Kosovo. For these favors, Serbia will allow Kosovo to have its own country code."

Telephony

Fixed-line telephony

Mobile telephony

Special codes

Notes

References

External links

List of Recommendation ITU-T E.164 Assigned Country Codes

Kosovo
Kosovo-related lists